The  or The Hymn of True Faith was written by the founder of Jōdo Shinshū Buddhism, Shinran.  It consists of an outline of the Pure Land teaching according to Shinran's personal interpretation. The structure is as follows:

 Homage to Amida
 Adoration to Amida and Shakyamuni Buddhas
 Exhortation to take refuge in Amida
 Teachings of the Patriarchs:
 Nagarjuna
 Vasubandhu
 Tanluan
 Daochuo
 Shandao
 Genshin
 Hōnen
 Exhortation

The Shōshinge is followed by six verses from Shinran's Sanjō Wasan. The first six verses of the Jōdo Wasan (浄土和讃) section of the Sanjō Wasan (based on Donran's San Amida Butsu Ge), are most frequently used but traditional temples work their way through the whole Sanjō Wasan on an annual basis.  In the past Hongan-ji temples chanted the Shōshinge and Wasan daily at 6am, but some Jōdo Shinshū temples now reserve the Shōshinge for special holidays due to its length.  The Shōshinge can take up to 30 minutes to chant in its entirety.

In Higashi Hongan-ji there are 10 styles of chanting the Shoshinge and in Nishi Hongan-ji 5. Only two or three styles are used regularly. The everyday style is fast, light and monotone whereas the formal styles are often slower, higher toned and more rhythmical.

External links 
 The Shoshinge and Wasan sung by the ministers of the Honpa Hongwanji in mp3 format.
 Shoshinge lyrics in Japanese and English
 The Shoshinge at the Collected Works of Shinran site

Buddhist music
Works by Shinran
Buddhism in the Kamakura period